Benzimidazole opioids, also known as nitazenes, are a class of synthetic opioids with an unusual benzimidazole structure often referred to as opioid New Psychoactive Substances (opioid NPS).  First synthesized in the 1950s by CIBA Pharmaceuticals as potential analgesic medications, several substances in the class have been identified, the best known being etonitazene.  Like other synthetic opioids, benzimidazole opioids bind the mu-opioid receptor and may exhibit potency up to several hundred times that of morphine.  While several substances in this class have found applications in research, they have never been used in clinical medicine due to their profound risk of respiratory depression and death, and have recently been recognized as emerging drugs of abuse.  Isotonitazine was first identified in samples of illicit drugs, and implicated in opioid overdose deaths in Europe, Canada, and the United States beginning in 2019. Previously known nitazene analogs such as metonitazine and butonitazine, as well as novel nitazenes not previously patented, have since been discovered in toxicologic samples during forensic investigations.

The structure-activity relationship of the drug class has been explored to a reasonable extent. The optimal substitution pattern is fairly tightly defined (i.e. N,N-diethyl on the amine nitrogen, 4-ethoxy on the benzyl ring and 5-nitro on the benzimidazole ring), but even derivatives incorporating only some of these features are still potent opioids. If a methyl or carboxamide group is added on the alpha carbon of the benzyl group, or the benzyl is replaced by 2-phenylethyl, compounds of similar activity are obtained. Relative analgesic activity values are derived from tests on mice and cannot be extrapolated directly to humans, though the same general activity trends apply. 

A 2019 publication has shown the possibility the previously assumed binding position of the benzimidazole class, acting as a semi-rigid fentanyl analogue may be incorrect. Based on a large scale analysis of known opioid receptor ligands a template was created through manual overlaying and alignment which has identified several mu-specific areas within the receptor. In this analysis, it is noted, etonitazene now more closely matches another, separate mu-specific region, sharing only a small area in common with the fentanyl class.

Table of benzimidazole opioids

See also
 25-NB
 Arylcyclohexylamine
 List of aminorex analogues
 List of benzodiazepines
 List of fentanyl analogues
 List of phenyltropanes
 Structural scheduling of synthetic cannabinoids
 Substituted cathinone

References 

Lists of drugs
Chemical classes of psychoactive drugs